X, in comics, may refer to:

X (Dark Horse Comics), a character and series by Dark Horse Comics
X (manga), a Japanese manga, also known as X/1999

See also
X (disambiguation)
Mister X (comics)